The 1928 Cal Poly Mustangs football team represented California Polytechnic School—now known as California Polytechnic State University, San Luis Obispo—as a member of the California Coast Conference (CCC) during the 1928 college football season. Led by eighth-year head coach Al Agosti, Cal Poly compiled an overall record of 3–4–2 with a mark of 1–2–1 in conference play, tying for fifth place in the CCC. The team was outscored by its opponents 90 to 45 for the season and was shut out in five of their nine games. The Mustangs played home games in San Luis Obispo, California.

Cal Poly was a two-year school until 1941. This was the last year for the CCC. The Mustangs had competed in the conference since its founding in 1922 and became an independent in 1929.

Schedule

References

Cal Poly
Cal Poly Mustangs football seasons
Cal Poly Mustangs football